Hamer Hall is a historic home located near Hamer, Dillon County, South Carolina. It was built about 1890, and is a two-story, brick dwelling in the Late Victorian style.  The house contains 14 rooms and has three large porches.  It has a corner turret and the roof is a combination of hipped and gable modes. The front facade features a one-story piazza with very elaborate ornamentation fashioned with chisel, gouge and lathe.  Also on the property are three barns, a windmill, and a water tank.

It was listed on the U.S. National Register of Historic Places in 1975.

References

External links
Hamer Hall, at South Carolina Department of Archives and History

Houses on the National Register of Historic Places in South Carolina
1890s architecture in the United States
Victorian architecture in South Carolina
Houses completed in 1890
Houses in Dillon County, South Carolina
National Register of Historic Places in Dillon County, South Carolina